The Wausau School District is a public school district serving the Wausau metropolitan area, including the City of Wausau and the Towns of Rib Mountain, Wausau, Stettin, and Texas. It contains two high schools, two middle schools, 13 elementary schools, and one alternative high school.

Schools

Elementary schools
 Franklin Elementary
 Grant Elementary
 Hawthorn Hills Elementary
 Hewitt Texas Elementary
 Jefferson Elementary
 G.D. Jones Elementary
 Lincoln Elementary
 Maine Elementary
 Rib Mountain Elementary
 John Marshall Elementary
 Riverview Elementary
 South Mountain Elementary
 Stettin Elementary

Middle schools
 Horace Mann Middle School
 John Muir Middle School

High schools
 Wausau East High School
 Wausau Engineering and Global Leadership (EGL) Academy
 Wausau West High School

Schools no longer existing
 Berlin School
Irving School, built in 1883-1970. Now offices.
 Humboldt School, built in 1873–1874
 Washington School, built in 1889
 Franklin School, built in 1883 and used until 1970. Built across the street as Franklin Elementary School in 1966.
 Lincoln School, built in 1883
 Columbia School, built in 1885
 Longfellow School, built in 1894; now administrative offices for the school district
 Wausau High School and Wausau Senior High, built in 1898 and renovated in 1936, 1951, 1961, and 1986. The old building is now an apartment complex.
 Horace Mann Junior High, demolished in 1984, rebuilt on 13th and Sells Streets as Horace Mann Middle School in 1993.
 Marathon County Training School for Teachers, built in 1889; the University of Wisconsin–Marathon County now occupies the site.
 A.C. Kiefer Educational Center, now the home of Central Wisconsin Children's Theatre, Inc.

Demographics

In 1981 there were 160 Hmong students in the Wausau School District. In the 1990s the Wausau School District received an increase of Hmong students, some of whom came from refugee camps and lacked formal education. In 1993 the Wausau School District began moving students, previously assigned to schools based on attendance zone, to a different scheme intended to equalize the ethnic proportions of Hmong and non-Hmong students. However it reverted to its previous scheme in 1994 after a negative reception from area parents.

By 2002, 12% of the Wausau population was Hmong, and 25% of the students at Wausau public schools were Hmong. Patti Kraus, who worked as a secretary for the WSD, stated in 2016 that the ethnic Hmong successfully adapted to American school life.

Proposed Elementary School Merger

On April 23, 2020, the Wausau School District Board of Education proposed closing six elementary schools and shifting middle school students. Specifically, if passed by referendum during the November 3, 2020 general election, the number of elementary schools in the district would be cut in half from 14 to 7. The consolidation would save $2.6 million in recurring expenses and $7.9 million in one-time expenses for the district.

The following elementary schools would be closed under the proposal:

Franklin Elementary
Grant Elementary
Hewitt-Texas Elementary
Lincoln Elementary
Maine Elementary
Rib Mountain Elementary
Wausau Area Montessori Charter

The following elementary schools would remain, but 5th and 6th graders in the district would be moved to the existing John Muir Middle School. 7th and 8th graders will be moved to Horace Mann Middle School.

Stettin Elementary
South Mountain Elementary
John Marshall Elementary 
Riverview Elementary
Thomas Jefferson Elementary 
Hawthorn Hills Elementary
G.D. Jones Elementary

Notable people
 Charles Zarnke, Wisconsin politician, was janitor for the school district after he left office

References

1861 establishments in Wisconsin
Education in Marathon County, Wisconsin
School districts in Wisconsin
School districts established in 1861